Art Center of Northern New Jersey is a fine arts school and gallery offering art classes to the general public. It was founded in 1956, and is located on the premises of the old Lutheran Church in New Milford, New Jersey, United States. The Art Center took over the building after the current Lutheran Church St Matthew's received its new home across the road.   

The facility caters to adult and children wishing to get schooled in fine art.  In addition to painting and photo studios the center can boast that it is the only place in the area which has a stone sculpture studio' with pneumatic equipment."  It also has a fully equipped printmaking studio supported by two Charles Brand presses, darkroom and high-intensity light table for photo-based platemaking. 

The Art Center offers a full year-round program.  Classes are taught by skilled professionals in drawing, painting (oil, acrylic, watercolor, mixed media), photography, print making, and sculpture in stone and wood.  Instructors monitor and teach life drawing and painting sessions.

The facility sponsors four affiliate groups of artists: painters, sculptors, watercolorists, and print makers. The Center's gallery program hosts local and national level exhibits on its premises in the Marcella Geltman Gallery.

Events
 The Tri-State Juried Watercolor Show (Sponsored by ACWA)
 Annual Bergen County Seniors Juried Art Show
 Annual Focus New Jersey Juried Art Show
 The Annual National Juried Show
 WCWA Tri-State Juried Watercolor Show

References

External links 
 The Art Center
 Art Center Painting Affiliates

Education in Bergen County, New Jersey
Arts centers in New Jersey
New Milford, New Jersey
Tourist attractions in Bergen County, New Jersey
1956 in art
1956 establishments in New Jersey